Tim O'Connor (born December 27, 1967) is an American football player and coach.  He was the 21st head football coach at Fort Hays State University in Hays, Kansas, serving for four seasons, from 2001 to 2004, and compiling a record of 20–24.

Head coaching record

References

1967 births
Living people
Boise State Broncos football players
Fort Hays State Tigers football coaches